Ahmet Mesut Yılmaz (6 November 1947 – 30 October 2020) was a Turkish politician. He was the leader of the Motherland Party (ANAP) from 1991 to 2002, and served three times as Prime Minister of Turkey. His first two prime-ministerial terms lasted just months (in 1991 and 1996), while the third ran from June 1997 to January 1999. The first was brought to an end by defeat in the 1991 elections, the latter two by the breakdown of Yılmaz' coalition governments.

Career 

Of Hamsheni origin, Mesut Yılmaz was a rising star in the Motherland Party of Turgut Özal, representing the Black Sea province of Rize in the parliament and serving in Özal's cabinet. He was State Minister for Information (December 1983), then Minister of Culture and Tourism (1986), and Minister of Foreign Affairs (December 1987 to February 1990). Upon Özal's election to the presidency in 1989, Yılmaz became the leader of an intraparty opposition to the new Prime Minister, Yıldırım Akbulut.

Prime Minister 

In June 1991 Yılmaz managed to discharge Yıldırım Akbulut from the party leadership and from all executive functions during the biennial party congress. Because ANAP had the majority in the parliament he subsequently became Prime Minister of Turkey in the 48th government of Turkey. However, in October ANAP came in second in the 1991 general election to Süleyman Demirel's True Path Party (DYP), and the DYP formed a coalition with the Social Democratic Populist Party (49th government of Turkey).

The following years saw a decline in the popularity of the Motherland Party and an acrimonious relationship with Tansu Çiller, leader of the center-right True Path Party (DYP). Yılmaz also made the Motherland Party more business-friendly and Europe-oriented, causing the more conservative, religious wing to switch to the Welfare Party (RP) of Necmettin Erbakan. In the December 1995 general election ANAP again came second, this time to the Welfare Party. After lengthy coalition negotiations Yılmaz formed a coalition with the DYP in March 1996 (53rd government of Turkey), but this lasted less than four months, falling to a censure motion led by the Welfare Party. President Demirel invited Erbakan to form a government, which he did, in coalition with the DYP.

Erbakan's term was marked by the Susurluk scandal, during the investigation of which Yılmaz admitted the existence of the JİTEM counter-terrorist Gendarmerie unit. The scandal led to the resignation of Erbakan's Interior Minister, Mehmet Ağar (a leader of the True Path Party, DYP), following revelations that Abdullah Çatlı, leader of the far-right Grey Wolves organisation, worked for the state. Yılmaz' concerns over his own safety, owing to his support of the Susurluk investigation, led to him briefly carrying a gun in self-defense.

Yılmaz formed a government for the third time in June 1997, after the Welfare Party had resigned from government following the February 1997 military memorandum. DYP and others expected to form a government under Tansu Çiller, but President Süleyman Demirel asked Yılmaz to form the new government. Yılmaz created an ANAP-Democratic Left Party-Democrat Turkey Party coalition which lasted until January 1999. Yılmaz' final term was marked by fallout from the investigations into the Susurluk scandal, and further revelations of connections between politicians, police and mafia. When the attempt to privatize the Türk Ticaret Bankası to Korkmaz Yiğit blew up in October 1998 over allegations of the involvement of mafia boss Alaattin Çakıcı, Yılmaz' coalition did not last much longer.

In October 1998, Yılmaz set off a furor in the Arab world by threatening to "poke out the eyes" of Syria over Hafez al-Assad's alleged support of the separatist Kurdistan Workers' Party.

Later career 

Yılmaz continued as a politician, however, serving as a deputy prime minister in a coalition led by Bülent Ecevit from 1999 to 2002. After his failure to win entry into the Grand National Assembly in 2002 elections, Yılmaz retired from politics to pursue a teaching career. A few days before the match between Fenerbahçe and Malatyaspor, the then-Prime Minister, Yılmaz, was a guest on a TV channel with Can Ataklı. During their conversation, Yılmaz made a statement: "By Allah's permission, we will make Galatasaray the champion this year too." Prior to the Malatyaspor match at Fenerbahçe's closed stands, a huge banner was unfurled, reading "We'll see you at the ballot box, Mesut Bey."

He was charged by the state public prosecutor with corruption during his tenure as prime minister relating to the privatization of Turkish Trade Bank. In 2006 the Supreme Court suspended the case for five years, so that the charges would be dropped if no similar charges arose in that period. Yılmaz announced that he would return to politics.

In the 2007 general election he was elected as independent member of parliament from Rize. He died from complications of lung cancer in 30 October 2020 and was buried at Kanlıca Cemetery two days later.

Personal life 

He was married to Berna Yılmaz. The couple became parents to two sons, Hasan Yılmaz and Yavuz Yılmaz, the latter of which was found shot dead in his apartment in Beykoz, Istanbul in December 2017. His son's death was reported as a probable suicide by Turkish police. Mesut Yılmaz's own licensed Smith & Wesson gun was found beside his son's body.

References

External links 

 Biography at Motherland Party's website
 Personal Website
 Biography at biyografi.net (Turkish)
 THE AWAKENING OF THE CONVERTED ARMENIANS:Notes of an Investigative Journalist 1980-2011 Hamo Moskofian / Mesut Yılmaz, “Hamshen Armenians PDF

1947 births
2020 deaths
People from Çayeli
Deputies of Rize
20th-century prime ministers of Turkey
Politicians from Istanbul
Istanbul High School alumni
Ankara University Faculty of Political Sciences alumni
University of Cologne alumni
Motherland Party (Turkey) politicians
Ministers of Foreign Affairs of Turkey
Prime Ministers of Turkey
Deputy Prime Ministers of Turkey
Leaders of political parties in Turkey
Ministers of Culture and Tourism of Turkey
Leaders of the Opposition (Turkey)
Turkish people of Hemshin descent
Turkish politicians convicted of corruption
Members of the 23rd Parliament of Turkey
Members of the 21st Parliament of Turkey
Members of the 20th Parliament of Turkey
Members of the 45th government of Turkey
Members of the 46th government of Turkey
Members of the 47th government of Turkey
Members of the 48th government of Turkey
Members of the 53rd government of Turkey
Members of the 55th government of Turkey
Members of the 57th government of Turkey
Ministers of State of Turkey
Heads of government who were later imprisoned
20th-century Turkish politicians
21st-century Turkish politicians
Deaths from lung cancer in Turkey
Burials at Kanlıca Cemetery
Centre-right politics in Turkey